Sir Richard Lewis Maxwell Faull  (born 21 October 1945) is a New Zealand neuroscientist and academic who specialises in human neurodegenerative diseases. He is a professor of anatomy and director of the Centre for Brain Research at the University of Auckland.

Biography
Faull grew up with four brothers in Tikorangi, Taranaki, where his parents, Phyllis Thelma Faull (née Rogers) and Wilfred Lewis Faull, had a general store. He attended the University of Otago, earning a Bachelor's of Science in 1967 and a Bachelor of Medicine (MB ChB) in 1970. He followed that with a PhD in neuroanatomy (1975) and Doctor of Science (DSc) in neuroscience (1994), both from the University of Auckland. Faull and his wife, Diana, have five children.

Research
Faull is noted for his research into brain diseases, particularly Alzheimer's, Parkinson's and Huntington's diseases. In 2007, his team at the University of Auckland proved that the brain can repair itself by generating new cells, debunking the theory that, once fully formed, the human brain could only degenerate. In 2009, he established the University of Auckland's Centre for Brain Research (CBR), to facilitate interactions among different groups and to promote new treatments for brain disease.

Honours and awards

In 2005, Faull was awarded the Health Research Council of New Zealand's Liley Medal and was appointed an Officer of the New Zealand Order of Merit, for services to medical research, in the 2005 Queen’s Birthday Honours. In 2007, he was awarded the Rutherford Medal by the Royal Society of New Zealand. In the 2017 New Year Honours, he was appointed a Knight Companion of the New Zealand Order of Merit for services to medical research.

References

External links
Faculty profile at the University of Auckland
Richard Faull: Giving back to the people

Living people
1945 births
People from Taranaki
Academic staff of the University of Auckland
Knights Companion of the New Zealand Order of Merit
Fellows of the Royal Society of New Zealand
New Zealand neuroscientists
University of Otago alumni
University of Auckland alumni
People educated at Waitara High School
Recipients of the Rutherford Medal